Time of Violence is a 1988 Bulgarian film based on the novel Time of Parting by Anton Donchev. It consists of two episodes with a combined length of 288 minutes. It premiered at the 1988 Cannes Film Festival where it was screened in the Un Certain Regard section. The film was selected as the Bulgarian entry for the Best Foreign Language Film at the 62nd Academy Awards.

Plot
The film is set in the Ottoman Empire, in 1668. As Köprülü Fazıl Ahmed Pasha concentrates his war efforts on the Cretan War, he grows paranoid of the Sultan's Christian subjects, convinced that they are an uncontrollable threat to the empire unless Islamized. One of the targets is Elindenya, a village located in a Rhodope valley where the Christian Bulgarians' way of life was for the most part left alone under the Ottoman governor Süleyman Agha's rule. A sipahi regiment is dispatched to the valley with the mission of converting the Christian population to Islam, by force if necessary. The extraordinary thing is that the regiment is led by Kara Ibrahim, a fanatical devshirme from Elindenya, and although Süleyman Agha, feeling that his self-ordained rule is at stake, objects to forced conversions, Kara Ibrahim favors measures of extreme brutality against the local Bulgarians, including his own family.

Cast

See also
 List of submissions to the 62nd Academy Awards for Best Foreign Language Film
 List of Bulgarian submissions for the Academy Award for Best Foreign Language Film

References

External links

1988 films
1980s Bulgarian-language films
Films directed by Ludmil Staikov
1988 drama films
Films shot in Bulgaria
Films set in the Ottoman Empire
Films set in Bulgaria
Films set in the 1660s
Films based on Bulgarian novels
Islam in Bulgaria
Bulgarian drama films